This is a list of Glamorgan first-class cricket records; that is, record team and individual performances in first-class cricket for Glamorgan. Records for Glamorgan in List A cricket, the shorter form of the game, are found at List of Glamorgan List A cricket records.

Team Records

Batting Records

Bowling Records

Partnership Records

Lists of English cricket records and statistics
Records